Okushima may refer to:
 Takayasu Okushima
 Uninhabited Planet Survive!#Main